The unditching roller is a device fitted to the front of military vehicles, such as the M3 Scout Car and the M3 half-track, for the purpose of preventing the vehicle from getting stuck in an obstacle, such as a ditch.

Upon entering a ditch, the roller prevents the front of the vehicle digging in to the opposite face of the ditch, instead the roller acting as a wide wheel enabling the front to climb out of the ditch more easily.

See also
 Unditching beam

References

World War II military equipment of the United States
Off-roading
Automotive accessories